The Thüringer Symphoniker Saalfeld-Rudolstadt is a symphony orchestra based at Rudolstadt in Thuringia.

During the reign of Count Ludwig Günther I of Schwarzburg-Rudolstadt, the orchestra appears as the "Rudolstädter Hofkapelle" in historic documents of 1635. Among the early music directors were Philipp Heinrich Erlebach (1657–1714) and Traugott Maximilian Eberwein (1775–1831). Eberwein performed several new works by Beethoven in Rudolstadt during the composer’s lifetime, including the Symphony No. 9 in 1827.

The Hofkapelle accompanied all opera performances in the Rudolstadt Theatre from 1793 onwards, which was used by the Goethe’s ensemble of the Weimar Court Theatre from 1794 to 1803. Among the operas were Weber's Der Freischütz (1822) and Auber's La muette de Portici (1828),  shortly after their premieres. Richard Wagner gave a guest performances in Rudolstadt for six weeks in 1834, when he was the young music director of the Bethmann opera company. The Rudolstadt Theatre staged Tannhäuser in 1855. Famous instrumental virtuosos played with the orchestra, including Niccolò Paganini in 1829 and Franz Liszt in 1844.

After the foundation of the Free State of Thuringia in 1919, the theatre was given the status of a state theatre and the orchestra was renamed "Thüringer Landeskapelle Rudolstadt". On 24 and 25 September 1921, the music director Ernst Wollong, together with the directors of the "Deutsche Musikabende" and the "Städtische Singakademie", organised the first "Historisches Musikfest" in Rudolstadt at the Heidecksburg Palace. Otto Hartung and Hans Swarowsky were also important conductors in the period between the two world wars. Eugen d'Albert conducted the orchestra in 1928 for the performance of his opera “Die toten Augen”.

The Landeskapelle Rudolstadt was unified with the 40-year old state symphony orchestra of the neighbouring town of Saalfeld after the German reunification, under the new name "Thüringer Symphoniker Saalfeld-Rudolstadt", and the theatre director Peter P. Pachl from Bayreuth attempted to revive the Rudolstadt festival tradition. A cooperation with the Landeskapelle Eisenach began in 1995, but ended in 2003.

Since 1997, Oliver Weder has been the music director. The orchestra offers  symphony and palais concerts as well as numerous special, youth and children's concerts in both cities. It also accompanies the music theatre performances at the Rudolstadt Theatre. The Thüringer Symphoniker cooperate with the music theatre ensemble of the Theater Nordhausen for the music theatre programme.

The orchestra has released CD recordings of instrumental works from the historical Rudolstadt music collection.

Since 2008 the orchestra has also participated at the annual Dance and Folk Festival Rudolstadt (TFF), playing with Arlo Guthrie and Juan José Mosalini, among others.

Directors and conductors 

 Philipp Heinrich Erlebach (1681–1714)
 Conrad Heinrich Lyra (1714–1738)
 Johann Graf (1738–1745)
 Christoph Förster (1745)
 Christian Ernst Graf (1745–1747)
 Georg Gebel (1747–1753)
 Christian Gotthelf Scheinpflug (1754–1770)
 Johann Wilhelm Gehring (1771–1787)
 Johann August Bodinus (1787–1792)
 Heinrich Christoph Koch (1792–1793)
 Johann Christian Eberwein (1794–1817)
 Traugott Maximilian Eberwein (1817–1831)
 Friedrich Müller (1835–1854)
 Ludwig Eberwein (1854–1855)
 Hermann Hesselbarth (1855–1893)
 Rudolph Herfurth (1893–1911)
 Otto Hartung (1911–1920)
 Ernst Wollong (1921–1924)
 Erich Böhlke (1924–1926)
 Helmut Kellermann (1926–1927)
 Joseph Trauneck (1928–1932)
 Hans Swarowski (1933–1934)
 Max Stumböck (1934–1935)
 Karl Vollmer (1936–1941)
 Helmut Diedrich (1945–1948)
 Wilhelm Biesold (1948–1949)
 Max Giernoth (1949–1951)
 Heinz Köppen (1951–1959)
 Carl Ferrand (1959–1961)
 Rolf Stadler (1961–1970)
 Klaus-Dieter Demmler (1970–1977)
 Konrad Bach (1977–1997)
 Oliver Weder (seit 1997)

Sources 

 Peter Larsen, Ute Omonsky, Markus Wakdura: Musik am Rudolstädter Hof: Die Entwicklung der Hofkapelle vom 17. Jahrhundert bis zum Beginn des 20. Jahrhunderts, Rudolstadt 1997.
 Eckart Kröplin, Peter P. Pachl (Hrsg.): 200 Jahre Theater Rudolstadt, Rudolstadt 1994.
 Ute Omonsky: Artikel "Rudolstadt" in Musik in Geschichte und Gegenwart online, Kassel 2016. (19.04.2020)
 Curly Strings & Thüringer Symphoniker – Estland-Folk trifft Bluegrass, Pop und Sinfonik. Deutschlandfunk, 14. Juni 2019.
 Kerstin Poppendieck: Sven Helbig beim 27. Rudolstadt-Festival – Elektroniker trifft Symphoniker. In: Deutschlandfunk Kultur. 8. Juli 2017.
 Joachim Lange: Eine Talkshow im Sonnenstaat – Cherubinis Oper „Idalide oder Die Jungfrau der Sonne“ in Saalfeld. In: Neue Musikzeitung. 19. Februar 2019.

External links 

 Thüringer Symphoniker
 Große Herausforderung: Thüringer Symphoniker verjüngen sich

German symphony orchestras
1635 establishments in the Holy Roman Empire